Decarie Hot Dog (founded 1969) is a diner counter restaurant and landmark located in Saint-Laurent, Montreal, Quebec, Canada, on Decarie Boulevard, near its intersection with Côte-Vertu Boulevard (and Metro station and transit terminus). It specializes in hot dogs and french fries. It is famed for its fries, poutine and Montreal-style steamies and it is reputed to have one of the best poutines in Montreal, as well as in Canada. In addition it is reputed for having some of the best hot dogs in Montreal. As such, it has appeared in some guides about Montreal.

Being a local landmark, several local celebrities have eaten at the restaurant, these include Rene Angelil, mayors of Montreal and mayors of Saint-Laurent, former leader of the Liberal Party of Canada, Stephane Dion, pro-athletes of the local teams.

With the development of the new public square, Place Rodolphe-Rousseau (named after artist Rudolphe Rousseau), associated with the metro station, across the street from the Decarie Hot Dog building, a full wall mural as painted onto the building. The artwork was painted by Dodo Ose of AShop Studio. The painting, L'Envol, a collaboration between the artist, Ville Saint-Laurent, the owners of Decarie Hot Dog, the Vriniotis family, was made to represent the owners' Greek heritage with the mythological topic of Pegasi. The Vriniotis family established the eatery, and as of its 50th anniversary, in 2019, still operates it. It retained the same menu for its first 50 years except for the addition of poutine in 1984. Also for its 50th anniversary, limited renovations were done to the restaurant, which itself is housed in a building that at the time was a century old.

References

External links 

1969 establishments in Quebec
Restaurants established in 1969
Restaurants in Montreal
Hot dog restaurants
Montreal cuisine
Saint-Laurent, Quebec